Navikai is a village in the eastern part of Ignalina district in Lithuania. According to the 2011 census, it had 124 residents. The village is situated on the left bank of the river Dysna. The village has a shop, JSC "Birvėta ponds", a cemetery and a car repair shop. In the south of the village lie many ponds.

Notable people 
 Nikolay Rudzinkas (1933–2006), rower

References 

Villages in Utena County
Ignalina District Municipality